Tharpu Chuli or Tent Peak is one of the trekking peaks in the Nepali Himalaya range. The peak has a nice central position in the Annapurna Sanctuary. It is easier to climb than both Hiunchuli and Singu Chuli which also are trekking peaks of the Annapurna. The ascent requires ice climbing equipment. A climbing permit from the NMA used to cost US$350 for a team of up to four members. As of 2017 NMA has removed Tharpu Chuli from its list of Trekking Peaks.

References

External links
 Tharpu Chuli on SummitPost

Mountains of the Gandaki Province
Five-thousanders of the Himalayas